Narender may refer to:

Narender Singh Ahlawat, SC, SM, recipient of the Sena Medal, Shaurya Chakra, which was awarded posthumously
Narender Bedi (1937–1982), Bollywood director and son of the writer Rajinder Singh Bedi
Narender Gahlot (born 2001), Indian footballer
Narender Grewal (born 1994), Indian wushu competitor
Narender Kumar Grewal (born 1998), Indian national men's basketball player
Narender Gupta, Indian politician
Narender Nath, member of the Indian National Congress party, member of the Indian Legislative Assembly
Narender Negi (born 1978), Indian former cricketer
Narender Ranbir (born 1989), Indian Paralympic javelin thrower competing in F44 events
Narender K. Sehgal (born 1940), Indian physicist, scientific administrator, and science populariser
Narender Pal Singh (born 1973), Indian former first-class cricketer
Narender Singh (Delhi cricketer) (born 1987), Indian former cricketer
Narender Singh (judoka) (1969–2016), Indian judoka who competed at two Olympic Games
Narender Thapa, Indian football midfielder

See also
Narendra (disambiguation)
Narrandera